USS Miantonomah may refer to the following ships of the United States Navy:

 , a cargo ship, was commissioned in 1941 and sunk by enemy action in September 1944
 , an auxiliary minelayer, was commissioned in 1950 and decommissioned in 1955

United States Navy ship names